Philip Michael Bosco (September 26, 1930 – December 3, 2018) was an American actor. He was known for his Tony Award-winning performance as Saunders in the 1989 Broadway production of Lend Me a Tenor, and for his starring role in the 2007 film The Savages.  He won a Daytime Emmy Award in 1988.

Personal life
Bosco was born in Jersey City, New Jersey, the son of Margaret Raymond (née Thek), a policewoman, and Philip Lupo Bosco, a carnival worker. His father was of Italian descent and his mother, German. Bosco attended St. Peter's Preparatory School in Jersey City, and later studied drama at Catholic University of America, where he had notable success in the title role of William Shakespeare’s Richard III.

Bosco married a fellow Catholic University student, Nancy Ann Dunkle, on January 2, 1957. They had seven children and 15 grandchildren. Bosco and his wife resided in Haworth, New Jersey.

Bosco died at his home of complications from dementia on December 3, 2018 at the age of 88. His funeral mass was held at Mount Carmel Church in Tenafly, New Jersey, followed by his interment at Brookside Cemetery in Englewood, New Jersey.

Career
Bosco began his career in Broadway theatre. He received a Tony Award nomination for his debut in The Rape of the Belt in 1960 and spent the next three decades supporting major stars in classic revivals like Cyrano de Bergerac, King Lear, and Twelfth Night.

He appeared in revivals of plays by George Bernard Shaw, including Man and Superman, Saint Joan, Mrs. Warren's Profession, Major Barbara, Heartbreak House (opposite Rex Harrison), and You Never Can Tell, winning Tony nominations for the last three. He also appeared with Shirley Knight in the Roundabout Theatre Company revival of Come Back, Little Sheba.

Following his Tony-winning performance in the farce Lend Me a Tenor in 1990, Bosco appeared on Broadway in An Inspector Calls (1994), The Heiress (1995), Twelfth Night (1998), Copenhagen (2000), and Twelve Angry Men (2004).

He played Grandpa Potts in the 2005 Broadway production of Chitty Chitty Bang Bang, and played the aged Captain Shotover in a Broadway revival of Heartbreak House in 2006. He retired from the stage in 2009 after appearing in the City Center Encores production of Finian's Rainbow, although he lent his voice to Douglas Carter Beane's 2010 play Mr. and Mrs. Fitch.

Bosco appeared regularly in the Law & Order television franchise, in roles ranging from judges to lawyers to villains.  His motion picture credits include Trading Places, Working Girl, Children of a Lesser God, Suspect, Walls of Glass, Straight Talk, Nobody's Fool, Wonder Boys, The Money Pit, Three Men and a Baby, Milk Money, Quick Change, Angie, The First Wives Club, and The Savages.

Bosco narrated Ric Burns' 1991 documentary film Coney Island, and voiced a number of characters for Ken Burns' documentaries for PBS. He portrayed Vincenzo the butler in the 1995 comedy It Takes Two; and Walter Wallace, father of the bride-to-be, in the 1997 romantic comedy My Best Friend's Wedding, co-starring Julia Roberts, Cameron Diaz and Dermot Mulroney.

In 1988, Bosco won a Daytime Emmy Award for his appearance in the ABC Afterschool Special "Read Between The Lines". He was a series regular on the FX original series Damages. He narrated Desert Giant: The World of the Saguaro Cactus by Barbara Bash on the PBS series Reading Rainbow in its sixty-second episode on March 27, 1990.

Bosco was inducted into the American Theater Hall of Fame in 1998.

Filmography and stage work

Film

Stage

Television

References

External links

Philip Bosco and Boyd Gaines, Downstage Center interview, American Theatre Wing.org; accessed August 23, 2014.
TonyAwards.com Interview with Philip Bosco

1930 births
2018 deaths
American male film actors
American male stage actors
American male television actors
American male voice actors
American people of Italian descent
American people of German descent
Catholic University of America alumni
Daytime Emmy Award winners
Drama Desk Award winners
People from Haworth, New Jersey
Male actors from Jersey City, New Jersey
Deaths from dementia in New Jersey
People from Teaneck, New Jersey
Tony Award winners
20th-century American male actors
21st-century American male actors
St. Peter's Preparatory School alumni
Burials at Brookside Cemetery (Englewood, New Jersey)